Kim Christiansen (born 14 September 1956 in Slagelse) is a Danish politician, who was a member of the Folketing for the Danish People's Party from 2005 to 2019.

Political career
Christiansen was a member of Mariager Municipality from 2001 to 2006, where most of the municipality was merged with Arden, Hadsund, Hobro and parts of Aalestrup and Nørager Municipality. In this new merged municipality, named Mariagerfjord Municipality, Christiansen sat in the municipal council from 2006 to 2011. He was first elected into national parliament in the 2005 Danish general election, and reelected in 2007, 2011 and 2015. In the 2019 election, he received 1,156 votes, but the Danish People's Party lost 21 seats, including Christiansen's.

References

External links 
 Biography on the website of the Danish Parliament (Folketinget)

Living people
1956 births
People from Slagelse
Danish People's Party politicians
Danish municipal councillors
Members of the Folketing 2005–2007
Members of the Folketing 2007–2011
Members of the Folketing 2011–2015
Members of the Folketing 2015–2019